Mud Lake is an oxbow lake located in northwestern DeSoto County, Mississippi and in southwestern Shelby County, Tennessee.  It was created by changes in the flow of the Mississippi River and borders Horn Lake (Tennessee) to the east. The lake was formerly accessible to the public. However, all surrounding land was purchased by Ensley Bottom Farms LLC thereby eliminating public access. The area has been turned into a private hunting and fishing club depriving many citizens from what was formerly a public lake used by many.

References

Bodies of water of DeSoto County, Mississippi
Lakes of Mississippi
Lakes of Tennessee
Bodies of water of Shelby County, Tennessee
Oxbow lakes of the United States